Joseph or Joe Wallace may refer to:
 Joseph Wallace (footballer), Scottish footballer, played for Newcastle United in the 1890s
 Joe Wallace (1890–1975), Canadian poet, journalist, and communist activist
 Joe Wallace (EastEnders), fictional character on the television series EastEnders
 Joe Wallace (footballer) (1933–1993), Scottish footballer
 Joseph Wallace (animator), animator and film director
 Joseph Wallace (murder victim) (1989–1993), three-year-old boy who was murdered by his mother in Chicago, Illinois
 Joseph Wallace (vegetarian) (1820s–1910), Irish activist for vegetarianism